This is a list of notable events in country music that took place in the year 2006.

Events
 January 14 – With the song, "She Let Herself Go", George Strait scores his 40th No. 1 hit on the Billboard Hot Country Songs chart, all of them solo. It ties a 20-year-old record for most No. 1's on the country chart, held by Conway Twitty (35 solo, five duet with Loretta Lynn).
 January 21 – Kix Brooks, one half of the country superstar duo Brooks & Dunn, takes over as host of "American Country Countdown," succeeding longtime host Bob Kingsley.
 April – Hank Williams Jr. is arrested in Memphis, Tennessee, for assault after attempting to choke a teenage waitress at a hotel there.
 May – People reports on the engagement of Keith Urban and actress Nicole Kidman. The two are married on June 25. Also during the month, Little Big Town members Jimi Westbrook and Karen Fairchild are wed; their marriage was announced in July.
 May 3 – Lynn Anderson arrested in New Mexico after causing a traffic accident at a local intersection due to drunk driving. She was released the next day on bond. Anderson was taken to court later that year where all her previous charges were dropped, as long as she didn't commit any more offenses.
 May 21 – Grand Ole Opry mainstay Billy Walker is killed in a car accident near Fort Deposit, Alabama, when the van he was riding in overturned along Interstate 65. Also killed in the wreck are Walker's wife, Bettie; and two member of his band. His 21-year-old grandson, Joshua Brooks, is critically injured. Walker was returning home from a show near Gulf Shores, Alabama.
 May 23 – The Tennessean of Nashville reports plans by Academy of Country Music to move its awards show to April, after consistently being drubbed in the ratings by powerhouse American Idol. The ACMs, which aired May 24 on CBS, appeared opposite Fox's American Idol for the fourth year in a row.
 June 24 – The first Midsummer Day country music festival in Drottningstorp is held.
 July 4 – Johnny Cash releases American V which instantly hits  #1.
 August 17 – Los Angeles' lone country music station, KZLA-FM, switches its format to urban pop.
 August 19 – Keith Urban's "Once in a Lifetime" becomes the highest-ever debuting song on the Billboard Hot Country Songs chart during the Broadcast Data Systems-era, ranking at No. 17 in its first week. "Lifetime" breaks the 10-month-old BDS-era standard set by "Good Ride Cowboy" by Garth Brooks.
 September 12 – Sara Evans and professional partner Tony Dovolani begin competing on ABC's Dancing with the Stars, to rousing reviews. Evans' gig will last four weeks.
 September 18 – Willie Nelson and several of his band members are charged with misdemeanor drug possession in Louisiana. State police had pulled Nelson's tour bus over for a routine commercial inspection and, after smelling a suspicious odor inside, searched the bus and found marijuana and psychedelic mushrooms.
 September 30 – George Strait finally breaks Conway Twitty's record by scoring his record 41st No. 1 hit on the Billboard Hot Country Songs chart with "Give It Away".

 September 30 – The documentary Dixie Chicks: Shut Up and Sing is released. The film chronicles the lives of the Dixie Chicks band members and the fallout that resulted after lead singer Natalie Maines made critical remarks about U.S. President George W. Bush during a 2003 concert in London, England.
 October 13 – One day after abruptly leaving Dancing with the Stars, news breaks that Sara Evans was seeking a divorce from her husband, Craig Schelske. Allegations Evans levied against Schelske included his affair with the family's ex-nanny, that he watched and downloaded pornography in the house, and his removal of $275,000 from the couple's joint bank account on the day the divorce decree was filed.
 October 19 – Keith Urban checks himself into a rehabilitation center for alcohol abuse.
 October 20 – Flicka, an adaptation of the 1941 children's novel, hits the movie theaters. Tim McGraw is in the leading adult male role as Wyoming rancher Rob McLaughlin.
 November 6 – The Country Music Association awards airs for the first time on ABC. The awards show had been on CBS since 1972. Keith Urban, who won the Male Vocalist of the Year, is absent due to his rehab stint, and co-host Ronnie Dunn read Urban's acceptance letter. Hall of Fame inductee Kris Kristofferson presented the inductions for 2006 inductees George Strait, Harold Bradley and Sonny James, each of whom gave brief acceptance speeches; Strait also performed his No. 1 hit "Give It Away." Controversy reigned when Faith Hill appeared to react angrily after Carrie Underwood won the Female Vocalist of the Year award.
 December 3 – The John F. Kennedy Center for the Performing Arts honors Dolly Parton for her lifetime contributions to the arts.

No dates
 No less than nine acts enjoyed their first No. 1 hit on the Billboard Hot Country Songs chart during 2006, the most since 1991. Those artists were Carrie Underwood, Josh Turner, Bon Jovi along with Jennifer Nettles of Sugarland, Jack Ingram, Jason Aldean, Rodney Atkins, The Wreckers, Heartland and Sugarland. Four of those acts – Bon Jovi, Nettles, The Wreckers and Heartland – turned the trick with their first charted country single. (Although she previously had two Top 5 hits and a Top 10 hit as a member of Sugarland, Jennifer Nettles made her first entry on the Hot Country Songs chart under her own name as part of a collaboration with Bon Jovi, which, in turn, also made their first Hot Country Songs chart entry. Their collaboration, "Who Says You Can't Go Home", ultimately peaked at No. 1 on that chart – a first for both Nettles and Bon Jovi – and as of late, it is the only No. 1 hit for either act there. Sugarland, Nettles' group, would eventually score their first career No. 1 hit on the same chart by the end of the year.)
 During that same 12-month time span, chart veteran George Strait extended his No. 1 string to a Billboard-best 41, beating Conway Twitty's record of 40 No. 1's, while Dolly Parton scored her 25th No. 1 (as part of a duet with Brad Paisley) and Kenny Chesney extended his string of No. 1's to 10.

Top hits of the year
The following songs placed within the Top 20 on the Hot Country Songs or Canada Country charts in 2006:

Top new album releases
The following albums placed within the Top 50 on the Top Country Albums charts in 2006:

Other top albums

Deaths
 March 23 – Cindy Walker, 87, prolific songwriter ("You Don't Know Me," "Cherokee Maiden"). (extended illness)
 March 25 – Buck Owens, 76, one of the pioneers of the Bakersfield Sound; co-host of Hee Haw. (heart attack)
 April 24 – Bonnie Owens, 76, singer-songwriter and ex-wife of Buck Owens and Merle Haggard (complications from Alzheimer's disease).
 May 21 – Billy Walker, 77, Grand Ole Opry legend best known for "Charlie's Shoes" and "Cross the Brazos at Waco" (car accident).
 August 14 – Johnny Duncan, 67, country music stalwart of the 1970s, best known for a series of duets with Janie Fricke. (heart attack)
 October 14 – Freddy Fender, 69, Tex Mex-styled singer-songwriter who achieved his greatest success in the mid-1970s ("Before the Next Teardrop Falls," "Wasted Days and Wasted Nights"), and recorded with two Tejano bands. (lung cancer)
 November 1 – Buddy Killen, 74, record producer and music publishing owner.
 December 22 – Dennis Linde, 63, well-respected songwriter of hits for acts ranging from Elvis Presley and Roger Miller to Garth Brooks and the Dixie Chicks. (idiopathic pulmonary fibrosis)

Hall of Fame inductees

Bluegrass Music Hall of Fame inductees
 The Lewis Family
 Syd Nathan

Country Music Hall of Fame inductees
 Harold Bradley (1926–2019)
 Sonny James (1928–2016)
 George Strait (born 1952)

Canadian Country Music Hall of Fame inductees
Terry Carisse
Brian Ahern
Curley Gurlock

Major awards

Grammy Awards
(presented February 11, 2007 in Los Angeles)
Best Female Country Vocal Performance – "Jesus, Take the Wheel", Carrie Underwood
Best Male Country Vocal Performance – "The Reason Why", Vince Gill
Best Country Performance by a Duo or Group with Vocal – "Not Ready to Make Nice," Dixie Chicks
Best Country Collaboration with Vocals – "Who Says You Can't Go Home", Bon Jovi with Jennifer Nettles
Best Country Instrumental Performance – "Whiskey Before Breakfast", Bryan Sutton and Doc Watson
Best Country Song – "Jesus, Take the Wheel", Brett James, Hillary Lindsey and Gordie Sampson
Best Country Album – Taking the Long Way, Dixie Chicks
Best Bluegrass Album – Instrumentals, Ricky Skaggs and Kentucky Thunder

Juno Awards
(presented April 1, 2007 in Saskatoon)
Country Recording of the Year – Somebody Wrote Love, George Canyon

CMT Music Awards
(presented April 10 in Nashville)
Video of the Year – "Better Life", Keith Urban
Male Video of the Year – "Who You'd Be Today", Kenny Chesney
Female Video of the Year – "Jesus, Take the Wheel", Carrie Underwood
Group/Duo Video of the Year – "Skin (Sarabeth)", Rascal Flatts
Breakthrough Video of the Year – "Jesus, Take the Wheel", Carrie Underwood
Collaborative Video of the Year – "Who Says You Can't Go Home", Bon Jovi Featuring Jennifer Nettles
Hottest Video of the Year – "Must Be Doin' Somethin' Right", Billy Currington
Most Inspiring Video of the Year – "When I Get Where I'm Going", Brad Paisley Featuring Dolly Parton
Video Director of the Year – "Like We Never Loved at All", Faith Hill Featuring Tim McGraw (Director: Sophie Muller)
Johnny Cash Visionary Award – Hank Williams, Jr.

Americana Music Honors & Awards 
Album of the Year – Childish Things (James McMurty)
Artist of the Year – Neil Young
Duo/Group of the Year – Drive-By Truckers
Song of the Year – "We Can't Make It Here" (James McMurty)
Emerging Artist of the Year – The Greencards
Instrumentalist of the Year – Kenny Vaughan
Spirit of Americana/Free Speech Award – Charlie Daniels
Lifetime Achievement: Songwriting – Rodney Crowell
Lifetime Achievement: Performance – Alejandro Escovedo
Lifetime Achievement: Instrumentalist – Kenny Vaughan
Lifetime Achievement: Executive – Barry Poss
Lifetime Achievement: Producer/Engineer – Allen Toussaint

Academy of Country Music
(presented May 15, 2007 in Las Vegas)
Entertainer of the Year – Kenny Chesney
Song of the Year – "Give It Away", Bill Anderson, Buddy Cannon and Jamey Johnson
Single of the Year – "Give It Away", George Strait
Album of the Year – Some Hearts, Carrie Underwood
Top Male Vocalist – Brad Paisley
Top Female Vocalist – Carrie Underwood
Top Vocal Duo – Brooks & Dunn
Top Vocal Group – Rascal Flatts
Top New Male Vocalist – Rodney Atkins
Top New Female Vocalist – Miranda Lambert
Top New Duo or Group – Little Big Town
Video of the Year – "Before He Cheats", Carrie Underwood (Director: Roman White)
Vocal Event of the Year – "Building Bridges", Brooks & Dunn, Vince Gill and Sheryl Crow
ACM/Home Depot Humanitarian of the Year – Brooks & Dunn
Cliffie Stone Pioneer Award – Dolly Parton, Don Williams and the late Harlan Howard and Waylon Jennings
Jim Reeves International Award – Buck Owens
Mae Boren Axton Award – Jack Lameier

ARIA Awards 
(presented in Sydney on October 29, 2006)
Best Country Album – Brighter Day (Troy Cassar-Daley)

Canadian Country Music Association
(presented September 11 in Saint John)
Kraft Cheez Whiz Fans' Choice Award – Terri Clark
Male Artist of the Year – George Canyon
Female Artist of the Year – Carolyn Dawn Johnson
Group or Duo of the Year – The Road Hammers
SOCAN Song of the Year – "Jesus, Take the Wheel", Brett James, Hillary Lindsey, Gordie Sampson
Single of the Year – "Somebody Wrote Love", George Canyon
Album of the Year – Hair in My Eyes Like a Highland Steer, Corb Lund
Top Selling Album – The Legend of Johnny Cash, Johnny Cash
CMT Video of the Year – "East Bound and Down", The Road Hammers
Chevy Trucks Rising Star Award – Johnny Reid
Roots Artist or Group of the Year – Corb Lund

Country Music Association
(presented November 6 in Nashville, Tennessee)
Entertainer of the Year – Kenny Chesney
Song of the Year – "Believe", Craig Wiseman and Ronnie Dunn
Single of the Year – "Believe", Brooks & Dunn
Album of the Year – Time Well Wasted, Brad Paisley
Male Vocalist of the Year – Keith Urban
Female Vocalist of the Year – Carrie Underwood
Vocal Duo of the Year – Brooks & Dunn
Vocal Group of the Year – Rascal Flatts
Horizon Award – Carrie Underwood
Video of the Year – "Believe", Brooks & Dunn (Directors: Robert Deaton and George J. Flanigen IV)
Vocal Event of the Year – "When I Get Where I'm Going", Brad Paisley and Dolly Parton
Musician of the Year – Randy Scruggs

References

Other links
 Country Music Association
 Inductees of the Country Music Hall of Fame
 2006 in Swiss music

External links
 Country Music Hall of Fame

Country
Country music by year